Change a Pace is an album led by pianist Duke Jordan recorded in 1979 in Denmark and released on the Danish SteepleChase label in 1980.

Reception

AllMusic awarded the album 2½ stars with a review by Ken Dryden stating "While none of Duke Jordan's compositions on this date ever became as well known as his "Jordu," "Flight to Jordan," or "No Problem," this session is warmly recommended".

Track listing
All compositions by Duke Jordan.

 "Change a Pace" - 5:46
 "I Thought You'd Call Today" - 5:42
 "Double Scotch" - 7:06
 "Miss Kissed" - 5:24
 "Diamond Stud" - 5:46
 "It's Hard to Know" - 7:18
 "Anything Can Happen" - 6:45 Bonus track on CD reissue
 "Deacon's Blues" - 4:57 Bonus track on CD reissue
 "My Queen Is Home to Stay"  - 2:47 Bonus track on CD reissue

Personnel
Duke Jordan - piano 
Niels-Henning Ørsted Pedersen - bass 
Billy Hart - drums

References

1980 albums
Duke Jordan albums
SteepleChase Records albums